Adam Best may refer to:

 Adam Best (actor) (born 1983), actor from Northern Ireland
 Adam Best (EastEnders), a character from the BBC soap opera EastEnders
 Adam Best (businessman) (born 1978), American entrepreneur and film producer